In enzymology, nicotinamide-nucleotide adenylyltransferase (NMNAT) are enzymes that catalyzes the chemical reaction

ATP + nicotinamide mononucleotide  diphosphate + NAD+

Thus, the two substrates of this enzyme are ATP and nicotinamide mononucleotide (NMN), whereas its two products are diphosphate and NAD+.

This enzyme participates in nicotinate and nicotinamide metabolism.

Humans have three protein isoforms: NMNAT1 (widespread), NMNAT2 (predominantly in brain), and NMNAT3 (highest in liver, heart, skeletal muscle, and erythrocytes). Mutations in the NMNAT1 gene lead to the LCA9 form of Leber congenital amaurosis. Mutations in NMNAT2 or NMNAT3 genes are not known to cause any human disease. NMNAT2 is critical for neurons: loss of NMNAT2 is associated with neurodegeneration. All NMNAT isoforms reportedly decline with age.

Belongs to
This enzyme belongs to the family of transferases, specifically those transferring phosphorus-containing nucleotide groups (nucleotidyltransferases).  The systematic name of this enzyme class is ATP:nicotinamide-nucleotide adenylyltransferase. Other names in common use include NAD+ pyrophosphorylase, adenosine triphosphate-nicotinamide mononucleotide transadenylase, ATP:NMN adenylyltransferase, diphosphopyridine nucleotide pyrophosphorylase, nicotinamide adenine dinucleotide pyrophosphorylase, nicotinamide mononucleotide adenylyltransferase, and NMN adenylyltransferase.

Structural studies

Isoform cellular localization
The three protein isoforms have the following cellular localizations 
 NMNAT1 : Nucleus
 NMNAT2 : Cytoplasm
 NMNAT3 : Mitochondrion or cytoplasm

All three NMNATs compete for the NMN produced by NAMPT.

Clinical significance
Chronic inflammation due to obesity and other causes reduced NMNAT and NAD+ levels in many tissues.

References

 
 
 

EC 2.7.7
NADH-dependent enzymes
Enzymes of known structure
Anti-aging substances